Zoster is another name for shingles.

Zoster may also refer to:

 Zoster (Attica), a cape in Attica, Greece
 Zoster (band), a musical group from Bosnia and Herzegovina
 Zoster (costume), a form of girdle or belt in ancient Greece